Thaxter's pinion (Lithophane thaxteri) is a moth of the family Noctuidae. It is found in North America. See the subspecies section for more details.

The wingspan is about 36 mm.

The larvae mainly feed on Myrica gale.

Subspecies
Lithophane thaxteri thaxteri (Grote, 1874) – Massachusetts
Lithophane thaxteri alaskensis (Barnes, 1928) – Alaska
Lithophane thaxteri rosetta (Barnes, 1928) – British Columbia

thaxteri
Moths of North America